Mamadou Samb Mbaye (born 31 December 1989) is a Senegalese-Spanish professional basketball player who last played for Real Betis Energía Plus of the LEB Oro. He has played in the EuroLeague with FC Barcelona Bàsquet and Bilbao Basket.

Playing career
In September 2016, Samb signed with Tindastóll of the Icelandic Úrvalsdeild karla for the 2016–17 season. He was released from the club in November as a part of a major roster overhaul where Tindastóll also released Pape Seck and fired head coach José Maria Costa. In six games, Samb averaged 22.0 points and 9.5 rebounds.

In August 2017, Samb signed with Club Melilla Baloncesto of the LEB Oro. On September 27, 2018, Samb signed a two-year deal with Real Betis Energía Plus of the LEB Oro.

Spanish national team
Samb played for Spanish national U-20 basketball team at the 2009 FIBA Europe Under-20 Championship where Spain finished third.

Personal life
Samb is the younger brother of former NBA player Cheikh Samb.

References

External sites
Profile at basketball-reference.com
Profile at realgm.com
Euroleague statistics at euroleague.net
Icelandic statistics at kki.is

1989 births
Living people
Bilbao Basket players
CB Breogán players
CB Granada players
Centers (basketball)
Club Melilla Baloncesto players
FC Barcelona Bàsquet players
Liga ACB players
Palencia Baloncesto players
Real Betis Baloncesto players
Senegalese men's basketball players
Spanish men's basketball players
Ungmennafélagið Tindastóll men's basketball players
Úrvalsdeild karla (basketball) players